The Vetlesen Prize is a prize in geology awarded jointly by Columbia University's Lamont–Doherty Earth Observatory and the G. Unger Vetlesen Foundation. The prize is generally regarded as the highest distinction in geologic studies, and the "Nobel Prize for geology".

Background
The Vetlesen Prize has been described as an attempt to establish an equivalent of a Nobel Prize for geophysics or geology. The prize is awarded for scientific achievement resulting in a clearer understanding of the Earth, its history, or its relations to the universe. The prize was established in 1959 and is awarded on average once every two years, if the jury selects at least one worthy candidate during this period.

History
G. Unger Vetlesen established the foundation which bears his name shortly before his death in 1955. In addition to the Vetlesen Prize, the foundation provides support in the Earth sciences for institutions of excellence. The prize is awarded for scientific achievement resulting in a clearer understanding of the Earth, its history, or its relations to the universe. The prize is awarded on average once every two years, if the jury selects at least one worthy candidate during this period.

Past recipients
Source:
 2023 - David L. Kohlstedt, USA
 2020 - Anny Cazenave, France
 2017 - Mark Cane, USA ;  S. George Philander, USA
 2015 - Robert Stephen John Sparks, United Kingdom
 2012 - Susan Solomon, USA; Jean Jouzel, France
 2008 - Walter Alvarez, USA
 2004 - Sir Nicholas Shackleton, United Kingdom : W. Richard Peltier, Canada
 2000 - W. Jason Morgan, USA ;  Walter C. Pitman III, USA ;  Lynn R. Sykes, USA
 1996 - Robert E. Dickinson, USA ;  John Imbrie, USA
 1993 - Walter Munk, USA
 1987 - Wallace S. Broecker, USA ;  Harmon Craig, USA
 1981 - Marion King Hubbert, USA
 1978 - J. Tuzo Wilson, Canada
 1974 - Chaim Leib Pekeris, Israel
 1973 - William A. Fowler, USA
 1970 - Allan V. Cox, USA
 1970 - Richard R. Doell, USA ; S. Keith Runcorn, United Kingdom
 1968 - Francis Birch, USA ;  Sir Edward Bullard, United Kingdom
 1966 - Jan Hendrik Oort, Netherlands
 1964 - Pentti Eskola, Finland
 1964 - Arthur Holmes, United Kingdom
 1962 - Sir Harold Jeffreys, United Kingdom
 1962 - Felix Andries Vening Meinesz, Netherlands
 1960 - W. Maurice Ewing, USA

See also

 List of geology awards
 List of geophysics awards

References

Awards established in 1959
Geology awards
Geophysics awards
1959 establishments in the United States
Awards and prizes of Columbia University